Akamaru may refer to:

Akamaru (Naruto), Kiba Inuzuka's dog in the Naruto series
Akamaru Island, an island in the Gambier Islands
Akamaru Jump, a special edition of Shōnen Jump published thrice a year